The 1971 municipal election was held October 13, 1971 to elect a mayor and twelve aldermen to sit on Edmonton City Council and seven trustees to sit on each of the public and separate school boards.

This was the first election in which a ward system was used.  Where previously all twelve aldermen were elected at large, beginning with this election three would be elected from each of four wards (starting with the 1980 election, this was changed to two aldermen being elected from each of six wards). The election was conducted under the block voting system in which each voter was given as many votes as there were vacancies.

Voter turnout

There were 101235 ballots cast out of 273271 eligible voters, for a voter turnout of 37.1%.

Results

(bold indicates elected, italics indicate incumbent)

Mayor

Aldermen

Public school trustees

Separate (Catholic) school trustees

Georges Brosseau - 13549
Jean Forest - 11991
Robert Sabourin - 10250
Leo Floyd - 9395
Jean McDonald - 9206
W McNeill - 8251
Larry Messier - 7676
Julia Kerans - 7492
A M Ambrock - 6479
Nicholas Sheptycki - 6045
Orest Eveneshen - 6037
Glen Hughes - 5052
Maurice Legris - 4627
Matt Reiser - 3666
Julian Hnatiw - 3523

References

City of Edmonton: Edmonton Elections

1971
1971 elections in Canada
1971 in Alberta
October 1971 events in Canada